More Light is the debut album by the alternative rock band J Mascis + The Fog, released in 2000. It can be seen as a solo album of sorts because Mascis played almost all of the instruments on the recording.

Production
The album was composed on electric piano. It was recorded and mixed at "Bob's Place", Mascis's home studio in his native Amherst, Massachusetts. The album title was inspired by the Hindu "hugging saint", Ammachi (also referenced on "Ammaring"). Kevin Shields of My Bloody Valentine and Guided By Voices frontman Robert Pollard contributed to some of the songs.

Critical reception
OC Weekly wrote that "the songwriting is familiar enough to please old Dino fans, especially those whose favorite album was Where You Been." The New Zealand Herald thought that "the songs are consistently good here right from the get-go when this kicks into life on the fuzz-storm opening of 'Same Day' (featuring the first of three vocal guest spots by Guided By Voice's Bob Pollard) then straight into the sleepy pop charms of 'Waistin', and 'Where'd You Go' with its Ziggy Stardust/ Mick Ronson riffery and skyscraping solo." The Washington City Paper opined that "Back Before You Go" "channels both Rainbow and Hüsker Dü to predictably savage effect." The Guardian praised the "tangibly zestful sense of engagement on the part of its creator."

Tour
The supporting tour for the album featured former Minutemen member Mike Watt on bass and former Dinosaur Jr collaborator George Berz on drums. On some stops of the tour, the band was joined by original Stooges members Ron Asheton and Scott Asheton. The tour was a key factor in the reformation of the Stooges (who also added Watt as their bass player, replacing the late Dave Alexander).

Track listing
All songs written by J Mascis.

Personnel
 J Mascis - vocals, guitar, drums, bass guitar, keyboards
 Kevin Shields - guitar, percussion, backing vocals
 Robert Pollard - backing vocals (tracks 1, 7, 8)
Technical
 Tim O'Heir, Phil Ek - engineering
 John Agnello - mixing

References

External links
Official J Mascis site

2000 debut albums
J Mascis + The Fog albums
City Slang albums
Pony Canyon albums